Vers is a river of Hesse, Germany. It is a right tributary of the river Salzböde, which it joins near Lohra.

See also
List of rivers of Hesse

Rivers of Hesse
Rivers of Germany